Princess Louise Caroline of Hesse-Kassel (28 September 1789 – 13 March 1867) was the consort of Friedrich Wilhelm, Duke of Schleswig-Holstein-Sonderburg-Glücksburg and the matriarch of the House of Schleswig-Holstein-Sonderburg-Glücksburg, which would eventually become the ruling house of the kingdoms of Denmark, Greece, and Norway.

Early life 
Louise Caroline was born at Gottorp, Schleswig, in the Duchy of Schleswig, to Prince Charles of Hesse-Kassel (19 December 1744 – 17 August 1836) and his wife Princess Louise of Denmark (30 January 1750 – 12 January 1831). Her elder sister Marie Sophie of Hesse-Kassel (28 October 1767 – 21 March 1852) became Queen consort of Frederick VI of Denmark.

Marriage and issue 
Friedrich Wilhelm and his relative Louise Caroline married in 1810. The couple had ten children: 
Princess Luise Marie Friederike of Schleswig-Holstein-Sonderburg-Glücksburg (23 October 1810 – 11 May 1869).
Princess Friederike Karoline Juliane of Schleswig-Holstein-Sonderburg-Glücksburg (9 October 1811 – 10 July 1902).
Karl, Duke of Schleswig-Holstein-Sonderburg-Glücksburg (30 September 1813 – 24 October 1878).
Friedrich, Duke of Schleswig-Holstein-Sonderburg-Glücksburg (23 October 1814 – 27 November 1885).
Prince Wilhelm of Schleswig-Holstein-Sonderburg-Glücksburg (10 April 1816 – 5 September 1893).
Prince Christian of Schleswig-Holstein-Sonderburg-Beck (8 April 1818 – 29 January 1906); later Christian IX of Denmark.
Princess Luise, Abbess of Itzehoe (18 November 1820 – 30 November 1894).
Prince Julius of Schleswig-Holstein-Sonderburg-Glücksburg (14 October 1824 – 1 June 1903).
Prince Johann of Schleswig-Holstein-Sonderburg-Glücksburg (5 December 1825 – 27 May 1911).
Prince Nikolaus of Schleswig-Holstein-Sonderburg-Glücksburg (22 December 1828 – 18 August 1849).

Louise Caroline's son, Prince Christian, was named third-in-line to the throne of Christian VIII of Denmark in 1847. He succeeded his childless maternal second cousin, Frederick VII of Denmark, on 15 November 1863, the Hereditary Prince Ferdinand having deceased somewhat earlier.

Her grandchildren included (among others) King Frederick VIII of Denmark, Queen Alexandra of the United Kingdom, Empress Marie Feodorovna of All the Russias, King George I of the Hellenes and Crown Princess Thyra of Hanover.

At the time of her death, she was the last surviving grandchild of Frederick V of Denmark.

Ancestry

References

External links 

1789 births
1867 deaths
House of Hesse-Kassel
House of Schleswig-Holstein-Sonderburg-Beck
Princesses of Schleswig-Holstein-Sonderburg-Glücksburg
People from Schleswig, Schleswig-Holstein